John of Brittany was Earl of Richmond.

John of Brittany may also refer to:

John I, Duke of Brittany
John II, Duke of Brittany
John III, Duke of Brittany